In mathematical set theory, a Cohen algebra, named after Paul Cohen, is a type of Boolean algebra used in the theory of forcing.  A Cohen algebra is a Boolean algebra whose completion is isomorphic to the completion of a free Boolean algebra .

References

 
Forcing (mathematics)
Boolean algebra